Aarno Armas Sakari Yrjö-Koskinen (9 December 1885, Helsinki – 8 June 1951, Helsinki) was a Finnish politician, Envoy and freiherr. He graduated as jurist and received the title varatuomari in 1915.

After the Finnish independence in 1917, Yrjö-Koskinen served under the Ministry for Foreign Affairs as Chief of political division from 1924 and Chief of staff from 1929. He worked as an Envoy in Moscow between 1 January 1931 and 8 April 1940.

Yrjö-Koskinen also served as the Minister of Foreign Affairs between 21 March 1931 and 15 December 1932. During his ministry Yrjö-Koskinen signed on behalf of Finland the Soviet–Finnish Non-Aggression Pact with the Soviet Union. At beginning of the Winter War he moved from Moscow to the Finnish embassy in Ankara. Yrjö-Koskinen served in Turkey till 1950, and yet a small time in The Hague, the Netherlands.

Yrjö-Koskinen's father was the Finnish senator Yrjö Yrjö-Koskinen and grandfather was senator and historian Yrjö Sakari Yrjö-Koskinen.

References

1885 births
1951 deaths
Politicians from Helsinki
People from Uusimaa Province (Grand Duchy of Finland)
19th-century Finnish nobility
National Coalition Party politicians
Ministers for Foreign Affairs of Finland
University of Helsinki alumni
Finnish diplomats
Ambassadors of Finland to Turkey
20th-century Finnish nobility